The acronym NMWA may refer to:

Museums
 National Museum of Women in the Arts in Washington, D.C. in the U.S.
 The National Museum of Western Art in Tokyo, Japan
 National Museum of Wildlife Art in Jackson Hole, Wyoming

Legislation
 National Minimum Wage Act 1998 Act of Parliament (U.K.)